Mihai Valentin Dăscălescu (born 20 December 1976) is a Romanian former professional footballer who played as a forward. He played in the Liga I for: Astra Ploiești, Petrolul Ploiești and Brașov. Currently he is the chairman of Unirea Alba Iulia

References

External links
 

1976 births
Living people
Sportspeople from Hunedoara
Romanian footballers
Association football forwards
Liga I players
Liga II players
CS Corvinul Hunedoara players
FC Astra Giurgiu players
FC Rapid București players
FC Petrolul Ploiești players
FC Brașov (1936) players
CSM Unirea Alba Iulia players
CS Minerul Lupeni players
Romanian football managers
CSM Unirea Alba Iulia managers